Crazy quilting is a quilt-making process.

Crazy quilt may also refer to:
 Crazy Quilt, a DC Comics villain
 Crazy Quilt (solitaire), a card game
 Crazy Quilt Mesa, a mountain in Utah